Thunderer may refer to:

 Thor, a nickname for the Norse God of Thunder is "the Thunderer"
 Colt M1877, a double-action revolver
 The Thunderer, a nickname for the British newspaper The Times
 HMS Thunderer, the name of a number of British naval vessels since the 18th century
 , a British tug in service 1953–58
 the anglicised name of the god Pērkons in Latvian mythology
 the prophet Elijah (in Eastern Europe)
 Thunderer, a fantasy novel by Felix Gilman
 The Thunderer, a DC Comics villain in Metamorpho's Rogue's Gallery
 The Thunderer (Marvel Comics), a Marvel Comics character
 The Thunderer, a character in The 7th Portal
 The Thunderer, a march by John Philip Sousa
 "The Thunderer" (Dion song), a 2007 song about Saint Jerome
 The Thunderer (Wyoming), a mountain peak in Yellowstone National Park
 Gromoboi (ship), two ships of the Russian Imperial Navy; "Gromoboi" is Russian for "Thunderer"
 Thunderer, a gun weapon from a popular game called Pixel Gun 3D.

See also 
 Thunder (disambiguation)